Henry Elijah Ackerson Jr. (October 15, 1880 – December 9, 1970) was a State Senator from 1915 to 1919, a New Jersey circuit judge from 1924 to 1947, and an associate justice of the New Jersey Supreme Court from 1948 to 1952.

Ackerson was born in Keyport on a small dairy farm in Holmdel Township, New Jersey to Cornelius and Anna B (Stillwell) Ackerson. He was purported to be the namesake of his paternal grandfather. Sometime in the early 1890s, the family moved to Raritan (now Keyport), where Henry graduated from Raritan High School. By 1900, Henry was working at a local bank while attending New York Law School from 1902 until 1904 when he passed the bar in New Jersey.

Ackerson resided locally until retiring in the 1950s and eventually moving into a nursing home in Holmdel where he died in 1970. He is interred at Holmdel Cemetery. The Justice Henry E. Ackerson Jr. Prize and Ackerson Hall, the home of Rutgers School of Law – Newark from 1966 to 1978 and still an academic building at Rutgers University—Newark, are named in his honour.

See also
List of justices of the Supreme Court of New Jersey
New Jersey Court of Errors and Appeals
Courts of New Jersey

References

1880 births
1970 deaths
People from Keyport, New Jersey
People from Holmdel Township, New Jersey
Politicians from Monmouth County, New Jersey
New Jersey lawyers
New York Law School alumni
Justices of the Supreme Court of New Jersey
Democratic Party New Jersey state senators
20th-century American judges
20th-century American politicians
20th-century American lawyers